Hanover Saugeen Airport  is located  west northwest of Hanover, Ontario, Canada.

The airport is classified as an airport of entry by Nav Canada and is staffed by the Canada Border Services Agency (CBSA). CBSA officers at this airport can handle general aviation aircraft only, with no more than 15 passengers.

References

External links
Website for Saugeen Municipal Airport
Page about this airport on COPA's Places to Fly airport directory

Registered aerodromes in Ontario